Washington High School (WHS) is the oldest of the five comprehensive public high schools in Fremont, California, United States. It was established in 1893. It is a part of the Fremont Unified School District.

History

Demographics
The demographic breakdown of the 1,939 students enrolled for the 2021–2022 school year was:
43.0% Asian
23.8% Hispanic or Latino
16.6% White
6.9% Filipino
4.8% Two or more races
3.7% African American
0.7% Pacific Islander
0.4% American Indian or Alaska Native
0.2% Not reported

Extracurricular activities

Athletics 
Washington High School has fourteen sports teams that each compete in the Mission Valley Athletic League (MVAL). These include cross country, American football, gymnastics, girls' tennis, girls' volleyball and water polo in the fall; basketball, soccer and wrestling in the winter; and badminton, baseball, softball, golf, lacrosse swimming, track and field, seniors vs. juniors powderpuff, boys' volleyball and boys' tennis in the spring. Cheerleading is done year-round. The 5,000 seat Tak Fudenna Stadium which serves all of Fremont's five comprehensive high schools for sports venues is located on the Washington High School campus.

Student publications
The student newspaper is a monthly titled The Hatchet. Some have been scanned in. The school's yearbook is the Washingtonian. The Hatchet won the Best of the West award in 2011 during the JEANC State Convention. A student literary magazine, The Scrivener, is published by the student club The Scrivener Society (formally Media Analysis Republic) once a year.

Student Organizations 
A sampling of 2022-2023 Washington High School clubs includes the following.

 Computer Science Club
 Photography Club
 Mechanical Keyboard Club
 Gaming Club
 Physics Society
 National Honors Society
 Engineering Club
 Cubing Club
 Painters Club
 Taal Club
 DECA
 Speech and Debate
 Robotics Club
 Quiz Bowl
 Vietnamese Student Union
 Black Student Union
 Filipino Student Union
 Film Club
 Infinite Career
 Liver Cancer Club

Notable alumni and faculty
 Steve Barnett: retired NFL offensive lineman
 John Doyle (1966– ): amateur and professional soccer player and coach
 Dennis Eckersley (1954– ): MLB pitcher
Dr. Joshua Fong
Mikh McKinney (1992– ): professional basketball player
Lee Murchison, former NFL player. He transferred before his senior season
 Bill Walsh (1931–2007): Washington High School football coach, 1957–59
 Lyle West: Class of 1995, NFL safety
 Robin Williams: author
 John Woodcock (1954–98): NFL defensive lineman
 DeAndre Carter: NFL Wide receiver and Return specialist for the Los Angeles Chargers.
 Steven Kwan: MLB Outfielder for the Cleveland Guardians

References

External links
Washington High School website 

Educational institutions established in 1893
1893 establishments in California
Fremont Unified School District
High schools in Alameda County, California
Schools in Fremont, California
School buildings on the National Register of Historic Places in California
National Register of Historic Places in Alameda County, California
History of Alameda County, California
Public high schools in California